Keith Webster (born 6 November 1945) is an English former footballer who played as a winger in the Football League for Darlington.

Webster was born in Stockton-on-Tees, County Durham, where he attended Stockton Grammar School. He signed professionally for Newcastle United in 1962, and remained with the club for four seasons, but never played for their first team. Webster joined Third Division club Darlington in 1966, and after nine matches during the 1966–67 Football League season, he moved into non-league football with hometown club Stockton.

He moved to Australia, where he played in the Victorian State League for Brunswick Juventus, with whom he won the title in 1970, as well as for Fitzroy United Alexander and Frankston City, before taking up coaching.

Notes

References 

1945 births
Living people
Footballers from Stockton-on-Tees
Footballers from County Durham
English footballers
Association football wingers
Stockton F.C. players
Newcastle United F.C. players
Darlington F.C. players
Brunswick Juventus players
Heidelberg United FC players
English Football League players
Expatriate soccer players in Australia